The Roosevelt Building is a high-rise residential building located along 7th Street in Downtown Los Angeles. It was completed in 1926 and was designed by Claude Beelman and Alexander Curlett in an Italian Renaissance Revival style. It was later converted to lofts.

In 2007, the building was listed on the National Register of Historic Places.

It is a 12-story building with an E-shaped plan, with light wells on the interior of the block. These facades are faced with off-white terra cotta made to look like rusticated stone blocks, which were manufactured by Gladding, McBean & Company.

The building was constructed by the J. V. McNeil Company who constructed several of the high-rises in Las Angeles at this time.

It is a three-part commercial structure, with a base, a shaft and a capital, consistent with Italian Renaissance Revival style.

It was deemed notable as "an excellent example of the Italian Renaissance Revival style as well as for its association with the distinguished architecture firm of
Curlett & Beelman."  It was built with "high quality materials and exceptional craftsmanship" and is one of the outstanding examples of Italian Renaissance Revival architecture in Los Angeles."

See also
 List of Registered Historic Places in Los Angeles

References

		
Buildings and structures in Downtown Los Angeles
Office buildings in Los Angeles
Residential skyscrapers in Los Angeles
Los Angeles Historic-Cultural Monuments
Commercial buildings on the National Register of Historic Places in Los Angeles
Office buildings completed in 1926
1926 establishments in California
1920s architecture in the United States
Renaissance Revival architecture in California